Incendiary is an American hardcore punk band from Long Island, New York.

History
Incendiary began in 2008 with a 7-inch EP titled Amongst The Filth. In 2009, Incendiary released their first full-length album titled Crusade on Eternal Hope Records. In 2013, Incendiary released their second full-length album, Cost of Living, on Closed Casket Activities. In 2017, Incendiary released their third full-length album, Thousand Mile Stare, on Closed Casket Activities. In 2017, they teamed up with CFO$ to record the theme song for NXT wrestler Aleister Black. Vocalist Brendan Garrone joined the members of Code Orange at NXT TakeOver: Brooklyn III performing Black's theme song live as he came to the ring.

Incendiary doesn't tour actively as a band, but they have played on a number of different shows and festivals throughout their tenure. They have played on France's Hellfest in 2022 along with groups like Metallica, Bring Me the Horizon and Mercyful Fate. They opened up Backtrack at one of their final shows in Amityville New York at the Revolution Bar & Music Hall. As tradition every holiday season, the band does a holiday show hosted at the Amityville Music Hall and they've been doing these holiday shows since 2013. The band did a short run with Glassjaw in the Spring of 2022, they joined up with groups like Folly and Life of Agony. The band is set to open up for E.Town Concrete at the Starland Ballroom in New Jersey on October 8.

Band members
Brendan Garrone (vocals) 
Matt McNally (bass)
Rob Nobile (guitar) 
Brian Audley (guitar)
Dan Lomeli (drums)

Discography

Studio albums
 Crusade  (2009)
 Cost of Living  (2013)
 Thousand Mile Stare  (2017)
 Change the Way You Think About Pain  (2023)

EPs and splits
 Amongst the Filth 7-inch  (2008)
 Incendiary/Suburban Scum  (2010)
 Incendiary/Unrestrained  (2011)
 Incendiary/Xibalba  (2012)

References

External links 
 Incendiary on Facebook

Musical groups established in 2008
Musical groups from Long Island